Virginia C. "Jenny" Graham (née Estes, born 1965) is an American businesswoman and politician serving in the Washington State House of Representatives for Washington's 6th legislative district, having first won the seat in the 2018 elections. She was re-elected in 2020.

Graham's "advocacy for victims of human trafficking and abuse" is informed by personal tragedy, the murder of her sister by the Green River Killer. She also supports the death penalty due to this event.

After an Inlander reporter wrote about her linking to conspiracy websites on Facebook in 2020, Graham called him a "cocksucker," a "lying piece of shit," "disgusting," "hateful" "sleazy" and accused him of an "attack on human trafficking victims."

References

1965 births
Living people
Politicians from Spokane, Washington
Republican Party members of the Washington House of Representatives
American conspiracy theorists
21st-century American politicians
21st-century American women politicians
Women state legislators in Washington (state)